Bethel Evangelical Secondary School is an evangelical Christian religious secondary school in Dembidolo, Qelem (Kelem) Welega Zone, Oromia Region, Ethiopia built and operated by Bethel Evangelical Church of the Ethiopian Evangelical Church Mekane Yesus, with financial assistance from the Presbyterian Church (USA). Academic programs follow Ministry of Education curricula, but also includes vocational education in wood- and metalworking, automobile repair, home economics, agriculture and typing. The school includes intensive religious education programs throughout the day.

References

External links 
 

Christian schools in Ethiopia
Education in Oromia Region
Educational institutions established in 1963
Protestantism in Ethiopia
Secondary schools in Ethiopia
Nondenominational Christian schools
1963 establishments in Ethiopia